{{DISPLAYTITLE:C16H20INO2}}
The molecular formula C16H20INO2 (molar mass: 385.2406 g/mol, exact mass: 385.0539 u) may refer to:

 RTI-352
 RTI-55, or iometopane

Molecular formulas